The 1950–51 Kansas State Wildcats men's basketball team represented Kansas State University as a member of the Big Seven Conference during the 1950–51 NCAA men's basketball season. The head coach was Jack Gardner, who was in his eighth season at the helm.  The Wildcats reached the Final Four of the NCAA tournament, losing to Kentucky in the National championship game, and finished with a record of 25–4 (11–1 Big 7).

The team played its home games at Ahearn Field House in Manhattan, Kansas.

Roster

Schedule and results

|-
!colspan=6 style=| Regular season

|-
!colspan=6 style=| NCAA Tournament

Rankings

Team players drafted into the NBA

References

Kansas State
Kansas State
NCAA Division I men's basketball tournament Final Four seasons
Kansas State Wildcats men's basketball seasons
1950 in sports in Kansas
1951 in sports in Kansas